Wang Pei-rong (born 17 January 1985) is a Taiwanese badminton player. She competed at the 2010 and 2014 Asian Games.

Career
In 2009, she won the women's doubles bronze at the East Asian Games, and at the same year she reach the semi-final round at the Hong Kong Open. In 2011, Wang won two bronze medals in the women's doubles and team event at the Shenzhen Universiade. In 2013, she won the women's team silver and mixed doubles bronze medal at the East Asian Games, and became the runner-up at the Osaka International Challenge tournament. Wang competed at the Kazan Universiade, and won two bronze medals in the mixed doubles and team event. In 2014, she was the semi-finalist at the U.S. Open Grand Prix Gold.

Achievements

East Asian Games
Women's doubles

Mixed doubles

Summer Universiade 
Women's doubles

Mixed doubles

BWF International Challenge/Series
Mixed doubles

 BWF International Challenge tournament
 BWF International Series tournament

References

External links
 

Taiwanese female badminton players
Living people
1985 births
Badminton players at the 2014 Asian Games
Badminton players at the 2010 Asian Games
Universiade medalists in badminton
Universiade bronze medalists for Chinese Taipei
Asian Games competitors for Chinese Taipei
Medalists at the 2011 Summer Universiade
Medalists at the 2013 Summer Universiade
21st-century Taiwanese women